Kanangra Falls is a waterfall on the Kanangra River, in the Kanangra-Boyd National Park, near , in the Central Tablelands of New South Wales, Australia.

Kanangra Falls is popular with canyoning and abseiling groups.

See also

List of waterfalls of Australia

References

External links
 

Waterfalls of the Blue Mountains
Tiered waterfalls